Park Road (orig. Lærkevej) is a Danish comedy-drama-series from 2009, currently with 22 episodes, which is produced by Cosmo Film for TV 2. The series is directed by Kasper Gaardsøe, Mogens Hagedorn and Tilde Harkamp, while the script is written by Mette Heeno, Christian Torpe, Tine Krull Petersen, Anders Frithiof August and Jannik Tai Mosholt. The first episode was shown on September 24, 2009.

It has been selected at the Monte-Carlo Television Festival in 2010.
The series includes shoots recorded at a former air base.

The title refers to Denmark's most popular street name, occurring in a total of 214 localities.

Cast

References 

Danish comedy television series
2000s Danish television series
2009 Danish television series debuts
Danish-language television shows
TV 2 (Denmark) original programming